The 2017 Trinidad and Tobago Pro Bowl was the thirteenth season of the Digicel Pro Bowl, which is a knockout football tournament for Trinidad and Tobago teams competing in the TT Pro League.Defence Force entered as the cup holders having defeated W Connection by a score of 2–1 in the 2016 final. Defence Force won the tournament by 5-3 on penalty kicks over Central after a 2-2 draw at the final whistle.

Qualification
Based on league positions before the tournament.

Enter at quarterfinals
1st. Central2nd. W Connection3rd. San Juan Jabloteh4th. Ma Pau Stars5th. Club Sando6th. Defence Force

Enter at Qualifiers
7th. Police8th. St. Ann's Rangers9th. Morvant Caledonia United10th. Point Fortin Civic

Results

Qualifiers

Quarterfinals

Semifinals

Final

References 

Trinidad and Tobago Pro Bowl
2017 in Caribbean sport